Lorenzo Filippini (born 28 July 1995) is an Italian footballer who plays as a left back.

Club career

Lazio

Loan to Bari 
On 14 August 2014, Filippini was loaned to Serie B side Bari on a season-long loan deal. On 22 November he made his professional debut in Serie B for Bari as a substitute replacing Stefano Sabelli in the 84th minute of a 2–1 home win over Trapani. On 6 December, Filippini played his first match as a starter, a 1–0 home defeat against Carpi, he was replaced by Giuseppe De Luca in the 78th minute. On 20 December he played his first entire match for Bari, a 1–0 home win over Latina. Filippini ended his season-long loan to Bari with 10 appearances.

Loan to Pro Vercelli 
On 4 August 2015, Filippini was signed by Serie B side Pro Vercelli on a season-long loan deal. On 22 September he made his Serie B debut in a 2–0 away defeat against Brescia, he played the entire match. Filippini ended his season-long loan to Pro Vercelli with a total of 14 appearances, including 11 as a starter, but in the second part of the season he played only 2 matches.

Loan to Cesena and Virtus Entella 
On 22 July 2016, Filippini was signed by Serie B club Cesena on a season-long loan deal. On 13 August he made his debut for Cesena in a 2–0 home win over Ternana in the third round of Coppa Italia, he played the entire match. On 27 September he made his Serie B debut for Cesena as a starter in a 0–0 away draw against Ascoli, he was replaced by Francesco Renzetti in the 72nd minute. On 14 October he played his first entire match for Cesena, a 1–1 home draw against SPAL. In January 2017, Filippini was recalled to Lazio leaving Cesena with only 8 appearances.

On 26 January 2017, Filippini was loaned to Serie B side Virtus Entella on a 6-month loan deal. On 11 February he made his debut for Virtus Entella as a substitute replacing Marco Moscati in the 16th minute of a 3–0 home defeat against SPAL. On 18 February he played his first entire match or Virtus Entella, a 0–0 away draw against Perugia. Filippini ended his 6-month loan to Virtus Entella with only 4 appearances, including 3 as a starter.

Loan to Pisa 
On 25 August 2017, Filippini was loaned to Serie C club Pisa on a season-long loan deal. On 3 September he made his Serie C debut for Pisa in a 0–0 home draw against Robur Siena, he was replaced by Giulio Favale in the 84th minute. On 10 September he played his first entire match for Pisa, a 0–0 away draw against Monza. On 7 April 2018, Filippini scored his first professional goal in the 50th minute of a 3–2 home win over Pro Piacenza. Filippino ended his season-long loan to Pisa with 35 appearances, 1 goal and 1 assist.

Loan to Cavese 
After not making any appearances for Lazio in the first half of the 2018–19 season, on 31 January 2019 he joined Serie C club Cavese on loan.

Serie C
On 10 July 2019, Filippini joined Gubbio.

On 5 October 2020, he signed a one-year contract with Triestina.

Career statistics

Club

Honours 
Lazio Primavera

 Campionato Nazionale Primavera: 2012–13
 Coppa Italia Primavera: 2013–14

References

1995 births
Footballers from Rome
Living people
Association football defenders
Italian footballers
Italy youth international footballers
S.S.C. Bari players
F.C. Pro Vercelli 1892 players
A.C. Cesena players
Pisa S.C. players
Virtus Entella players
Cavese 1919 players
A.S. Gubbio 1910 players
U.S. Triestina Calcio 1918 players
Serie B players
Serie C players